The Vanuatu women's national rugby sevens team is Vanuatu's national representative in rugby sevens. They debuted at the 2019 Oceania Women's Sevens Championship in Fiji. They placed tenth overall out of twelve competing teams.

References 

Women's national rugby sevens teams
Women's sport in Vanuatu